is a Japanese resist dyeing technique where dyes are applied inside outlines of dyed or undyed rice-paste resist, which may be drawn freehand or stencilled; the paste keeps the dye areas separated. Originating in the 17th century, the technique became popular as both a way of subverting sumptuary laws on dress fabrics, and also as a way to quickly produce kimono that appeared to be painted freehand with dyes. The technique was named after Miyazaki Yūzen, a 17th century fan painter who perfected the technique. A fashion for elaborate pictorial  designs lasted until 1692.

Technique
There are several subtypes of  technique.

First, a sketch is drawn freehand on the cloth or paper, using a black heat-labile ink made from dayflowers. A paste of rice powder, rice paste, rice bran and lime (called ) is then piped from a cone, following the outline. These ridges of paste are called . A bean-based liquid called  is then applied as a mordant, to make the dyes penetrate better. The dye-application stage is called . Dye is painted on using a brush. The ridges of paste separate the areas of dye, rather like cloissoné enamel. Within an area of dye, the brush can be used to apply ombré gradients ("ombré-dyeing"). The background is dyed by covering all of the already-dyed areas with additional resist pastes, then applying the background dye either with a brush, or by dipping the fabric in a vat of dye, sometimes with additional  (tie-dye) patterning. The  step washes the paste out of the fabric; this is now done in a specialized sink rather than a clear stream. The cloth may then be steamed again to adjust its dimensions, and other forms of decoration, such as embroidery, could be applied.

In the 1870s, the  technique was developed. It used synthetic aniline dyes, newly-introduced to Japan, and mixed them with the  resist-paste. When the cloth was steamed, the dyes would penetrate the cloth, while the paste remained on the surface. The  thus acted as both a dye and a resist against the other dyes. Stencils were extensively used. In 1879, this technique was used to dye a wool cloth called , producing  (wool was a new import to Japan at the time). Adapting the technique to silk took more time; Hirose Jisuke of Kyoto is credited for developing the  technique.

In 1881, improvements in the dye-paste and steaming techniques made it possible to dye the background using paste, often using brighter colours than traditional techniques. Instead of scrolling the cloth past an artist who decorated part of it at a time, the whole length was spread on a board. All of the coloured pastes were applied through stencils with a spatula, and a different stencil was used for each colour (rather like Japanese woodblock printing). Brushwork through stencils was used only for creating gradients. A stencil for undyed paste was used to create skiamorphic white outlines between the areas of colour, making the finished  pattern resemble .

The Exposition Universelle of 1900 in Paris introduced  (a Western art movement heavily influenced by Japanese art) to Japanese artists.

Though similar in appearance to  differs in application, with  pieces generally using one application of rice paste before dyeing, typically in an indigo dyebath, resulting in a characteristic blue-and-white end result. In contrast,  can feature a number of repeated applications of rice paste, with dye hand painted into certain areas before the resist is removed.

Present day
Dyers such as Moriguchi Kako of Kyoto continue to create  dyed kimono, which were so sought after that the contemporary fashion industry designed an industrial method to copy them for use on Western style clothing. Famous designers, such as Hanae Mori, borrowed extensively from kimono patterns for their couturier collections. By the late 1980s, a new handwoven and hand-dyed kimono had become extremely costly, running to US$25,000 for a formal garment.

In Okinawa,  techniques have also been used to produce the stencil dyed  fabric native to that region, producing brightly-coloured textiles considered to be artistic national treasures.

variations
The technique first appeared in the 19th century and was described in 1905 by Basil Hall Chamberlain. Although technically a form of velvet painting,  works are not comparable to Western and Middle Eastern velvet paintings, which utilise velvet as a canvas.

See also
 , a traditional Japanese wax resist dye technique
 , a traditional stencil resist dye technique
 , a hand applied dye resist technique similar to

References

External links
 
 
 

Japanese art terminology
Japanese dyeing techniques
Japanese words and phrases